The 1996 United States presidential election in Ohio took place on November 5, 1996. All 50 states and the District of Columbia, were part of the 1996 United States presidential election. State voters chose 21 electors to the Electoral College, which selected the president and vice president.

Ohio was won by incumbent United States President Bill Clinton of Arkansas, who was running against Kansas Senator Bob Dole. Clinton ran a second time with former Tennessee Senator Al Gore as vice president, and Dole ran with former New York Congressman Jack Kemp.

Ohio weighed in for this election as 2% more third-party than the national average. The presidential election of 1996 was a very multi-partisan election for Ohio, with over 11% of the electorate voting for third-party candidates. Most counties in the state turned out more for Dole than Clinton. Two notable exceptions to this trend were Cleveland's Cuyahoga County, and residents of several counties on the Eastern border with Pennsylvania, who voted largely for Clinton. In his second bid for the presidency, Ross Perot led the newly reformed Reform Party to gain over 10% of the votes in Ohio, and to pull in support nationally as the most popular third-party candidate to run for United States Presidency in recent times.

, this is the last election in which the following counties voted for a Democratic presidential candidate: Columbiana, Harrison, Hocking, Jackson, Lawrence, Meigs, Perry, Pike, Scioto, Vinton, Carroll, Gallia, Guernsey, Huron, Noble, Ross, and Seneca. This was the first presidential election in Ohio since 1940 where the Democratic candidate won consecutive elections.

Results

Results by county

Counties that flipped from Democratic to Republican
Coshocton (Largest city: Coshocton)

Counties that flipped from Republican to Democratic
Gallia (Largest city: Gallipolis)
Huron (Largest city: Norwalk)
Jackson (Largest city: Jackson)
Lake (Largest city: Mentor)
Noble (Largest city: Caldwell)
Ross (Largest city: Chilicothe)
Sandusky (Largest city: Fremont)
Seneca (Largest city: Tiffin)

See also
 United States presidential elections in Ohio
 Presidency of Bill Clinton

References

Ohio
1996
1996 Ohio elections